Ewell Thomas was a Negro league infielder in the 1920s.

Thomas made his Negro leagues debut in 1922 with the Kansas City Monarchs. He went on to play for the St. Louis Stars in 1923 and 1924, his final professional season.

References

External links
 and Seamheads

Place of birth missing
Place of death missing
Year of birth missing
Year of death missing
Kansas City Monarchs players
St. Louis Stars (baseball) players
Baseball infielders